Quah Kim Song (born February 1952) is a former Singapore international footballer who played as a striker.

Quah's swift agility earned him the nicknames "Mercurial", "Quicksilver" and  "Speed Demon" by fans and media. Among his most memorable matches was the 1977 Malaysia Cup Final at Merdeka Stadium in Kuala Lumpur, Malaysia, where he scored two goals in a 3–2 win for Singapore against Penang.

He is the FAS-S.League's Director of Competitions. He was also part of the Singapore national football team, and has played at Burnley United and Tampines Rovers.

He and four of his brothers Kim Beng, Kim Siak, Kim Lye and Kim Swee played for Singapore, while another brother Kim Tiong was a triple jumper.

Quah received his secondary education at Naval Base Secondary School and pre-university education at Raffles Institution.

Personal life
Quah was married to Shirley Wang, a bank manager at OCBC. She was a member of the Honeydrops, a music group that participated in Talentime, a talent competition organised by Radio Television Singapore. They had two children, Leonora and Leon. Shirley succumbed to cancer in 2007.

Quah is currently the partner of Workers' Party politician Sylvia Lim.

Honours

International 
Singapore
Malaysia Cup: 1977

Filmography

Television dramas

References

Living people
1952 births
Singaporean footballers
Singapore international footballers
Singaporean sportspeople of Chinese descent
Raffles Institution alumni
Singapore FA players
Association football forwards